The Sydoriv Castle (Ukrainian: Сидорівський замок) is an imposing ruin of a stronghold built by Marcin Kalinowski in Sydoriv, a village located 7 km south of Husiatyn. The castle is perched on a hilltop which is enclosed on three sides by a river. When built in the 1640s, the structure had seven towers that extended for 178 metres from north to south. It was heavily damaged by the invading Turks in 1672 and was abandoned by its owners in the 18th century.

References
 Памятники градостроительства и архитектуры Украинской ССР. В 4-х томах. К.: Будівельник, 1983–1986. Том 4, с.63-64.

External links

Castles in Ukraine
Ruins in Ukraine
Castles in Ternopil Oblast